Alternate Outlaws is an alternate history anthology edited by Mike Resnick, published in the United States by Tor Books. There are 28 stories in the anthology, with each story by a different author, and presents a scenario where various historical figures become criminals or outlaws rather than their real life counterparts. The anthology was released on October 15, 1994.

Stories

See also
 List of works by Mike Resnick

References

1994 books
Alternate history anthologies
Tor Books books
Cultural depictions of Julius Caesar
Cultural depictions of Elizabeth I
Cultural depictions of Benjamin Franklin
Cultural depictions of Mahatma Gandhi
Cultural depictions of Ernest Hemingway
Cultural depictions of Adolf Hitler
Cultural depictions of Harry Houdini
Cultural depictions of Jesse James
Cultural depictions of Helen Keller
Cultural depictions of John F. Kennedy
Cultural depictions of Martin Luther King Jr.
Cultural depictions of Mary I of England
Cultural depictions of Charles Manson
Cultural depictions of Karl Marx
Cultural depictions of Elvis Presley
Charles Ponzi